Hannah Elizabeth Keane (born May 7, 1993) is an American professional soccer player, who plays as a forward for A-League Women club Western United.

Career

High school and college 
Keane began her career as a competitive player for Sacramento United FC, and later with Union Sacramento FC where she was selected to attend Adidas Elite Soccer Player Recruiting event in 2009.

In 2011 she joined the NCAA Division 1 San Diego State Aztecs, where she had five goals in 19 games in her inaugural season. Over her career with the Aztecs, Keane scored a total of 29 goals, ranking her fifth all time in the club's history.

San Diego SeaLions
In her first senior role during the 2014 summer break, she played for the San Diego SeaLions in the Women's Premier Soccer League where she scored nine times in five games.

Newcastle United
In the spring of 2015 Keane spent a semester in England where she tried out and secured a position with Newcastle United.  She appeared in 5 matches and helped Newcastle obtain several league points.

Alamein, Victoria
After graduation from SDSU, Keane signed with NPL Victoria team Alamein in 2016.  Although injured for half the season she still managed to score 15 goals in 18 appearances and garner Media Player of the year for the league.

Boston Breakers
She returned to the United States in early June 2017 and joined the reserve team for the Boston Breakers in the Women's Premier Soccer League.

USV Jena
On 17 July 2017, she signed for Frauen-Bundesliga club FF USV Jena, where she made her debut in September 2017. In addition to five games in the Bundesliga, Keane played 15 games in Jena’s second team in the Bundesliga North and was their top scorer.

SC Braga
After departing Jena, on 21 August 2018 Keane signed in Portugal with SC Braga. She played with Braga for three seasons and helped them to achieve several team trophies.

Huelva
Keane signed with Sporting de Huelva in the Spanish Primera Iberdrola League, playing for a single season.  She was an important contributor towards getting the team to the finals of the Copa de la Reina.

Western United
On 9 August 2022 Keane signed with the Australian A-League Women club Western United for their inaugural season; she was the team's first international signing.

Personal life 
Keane attended St Francis High School for two years and then transferred to CK McClatchy for her junior and senior years. She earned a bachelor of science degree in Health Communications from San Diego State University.

Honors 
Braga
 Campeonato Nacional: 2018–19
 Taça de Portugal Feminina: 2019–20
 Supertaça de Portugal: 2018

Sporting de Huelva
 Copa de la Reina runner-up: 2021–22

References

External links 
 

1993 births
Living people
FF USV Jena players
S.C. Braga (women's football) players
Sporting de Huelva players
Western United FC (A-League Women) players
American women's soccer players
Women's association football forwards
People from Sacramento, California
Sportspeople from Sacramento, California
San Diego State University alumni